Axinotarsus is a genus of beetles of the subfamily Malachiinae.

Species
Axinotarsus brevicornis
Axinotarsus doderoi
Axinotarsus insularis
Axinotarsus italicus
Axinotarsus longicornis
Axinotarsus marginalis
Axinotarsus nigritarsis
Axinotarsus peninsularis
Axinotarsus pulicarius
Axinotarsus ruficollis
Axinotarsus siciliensis
Axinotarsus tristiculus
Axinotarsus tristis
Axinotarsus varius

References

External links 
 Axinotarsus at Zipcode Zoo 
 

Melyridae
Cleroidea genera